Esson may refer to:

People
 George Esson (born 1942), Scottish police officer
 Henry Esson Young (1862–1939), Canadian physician and politician
 John Esson (1800–1860), Canadian merchant and politician
 Katja Esson, German-American filmmaker
 Louis Esson (1878–1943), Australian poet, journalist, critic and playwright
Rachel Esson (born 1965), New Zealand librarian
 Ryan Esson (born 1980), Scottish football goalkeeper
 Victoria Esson (born 1991), New Zealand association football goalkeeper
 William Esson (1838–1916), British mathematician

Places
 Esson, Calvados, commune in the Calvados department in the Normandy region in northwestern France

Other uses
 Herpystis esson, species of moth of the family Tortricidae

See also
 Essonne, homophonous toponym